The role of The Doon School in Indian mountaineering describes the formative links between The Doon School, an all-boys boarding school in Dehradun, India and early post-Independence Indian mountaineering. From the 1940s onwards, Doon's masters and students like A.E. Foot, R.L. Holdsworth, J.A.K. Martyn, Gurdial Singh, Jack Gibson, Aamir Ali, Hari Dang, Nandu Jayal, were among the first to go on major Himalayan expeditions in a newly independent nation. These early expeditions contributed towards laying the foundation of mountaineering in an independent India.

History
Doon's founding British headmaster A.E. Foot and masters J.A.K. Martyn, R.L. Holdsworth and Jack Gibson were all Alpinists and introduced regular mountaineering expeditions for the boys during the school year. Located in the Doon Valley, in the foothills of the Himalayas, the school proved to be an ideal starting point for treks to the mountains. The British masters were joined by Gurdial Singh who led the first Indian expedition to Trisul in 1951 and was a member of the first Indian expedition to Mount Everest in 1965. Singh was accompanied by Narendra Dhar Jayal, then a student at Doon, who later went on to pioneer mountaineering in India and became, at Jawaharlal Nehru's behest, the founder principal of the Himalayan Mountaineering Institute. In an interview to Indian Express, the Indian mountaineer, author and editor of Himalayan Journal, Harish Kapadia stated, "There were very few Indians in the club initially [the Himalayan Club]. In 1947, when the British left, people thought that mountaineering and the club will not hold up in India. Then in 1951, a Doon School teacher, Gurdial Singh, and few others went on a trek to the Trisul peak in the Kumaon region. That’s how Indian mountaineering took off."

Western Garhwal

Kapadia describes in his book, Across Peaks & Passes in Garhwal Himalaya, how Doon's masters and pupils first explored the Western Garhwal region, which comprises peaks like Bandarpunch and Kalanag.  In Tourism in Garhwal Himalaya, mountaineer Harshwanti Bisht further discusses the school's early expeditions to Badrinath, Kamet and Jaonli.

Present day
Doon's students and faculty continue the mountaineering tradition in the form of 'midterms', established by the British masters. Midway through each term, students go on treks in the Himalayas or abroad. Recent expeditions have been to Stok Kangri, Mont Blanc, Island Peak, Mount Everest base camp, Mount Kilimanjaro.

Major expeditions

1946, 1950 – Bandarpunch (6316m). (In 1937, Gibson and Martyn climbed Bandarpunch along with Tenzing Norgay. Later, in his autobiography, Norgay would refer to Bandarpunch as the "Doon School mountain".)
1951 – Trisul (7120m) (First Indian expedition, led by the Doon master, Gurdial Singh)
1952 – Kamet (7756m) 
1953, 1955 – Abi Gamin (7355m) 
1955 - Kalanag (6387m) or 'Black Peak'. First ascent by Gibson and Doon's pupils. 
1958 - Mrigthuni (6855m). First ascent by a team led by Gurdial Singh; Aamir Ali, another Doon master, was a member of the expedition.
1961 – Nanda Devi (7816m, summit not reached). Members included masters Gurdial Singh, Hari Dang and former pupil Suman Dubey 
1965 – Kalanag (6387m)
1965 - Jaonli (6632m), expedition led by Hari Dang
1984 - Kalanag (6387m) or 'Black Peak'
1996 - Kedar Dome (6832m), student expedition led by master S.C. Biala

References

Bibliography

External links
 Himalayan Mountaineering Institute
 The Doon School Adventure Club

The Doon School
Mountaineering in India
History of mountaineering